Sir John Shelley, Esquire, of Michelgrove, who was created a Baronet 22 May 1611. This gentleman, in the 5th of James I, alienated his Warwickshire estates, and transferred their produce to the county Sussex, where he purchased others. He married Jane, daughter of Sir Thomas Reresby, Knight, of Thriberg, and had issue.

Sir John was the eldest son of John Shelley (d.1592), Esquire, and Eleanor, the daughter of Sir Thomas Lovell, Knight, of East Harling, county Norfolk. His paternal grandparents were John Shelley (d.1550), Esquire, of Michelgrove and Mary, daughter of Sir William FitzWilliam, Knight, and granddaughter maternally of Sir Richard Sackville, Knight, of Buckhurst. His paternal grandmother Mary FitzWilliam was the niece of John Sackville and the cousin of Sir Richard Sackville.

Sir John was the great-grandson of Sir William Shelley, one of the justices of the Court of Common Pleas.

Children of Sir John Shelley and Jane Reresby:

 Sir William Shelley, Knight, who married Christina, daughter of Sir James Vantelet, Knight. This " Sir James Vantelet, Knight" was Jacques le Lux, Sieur de Vantelet, Gentleman Usher to Queen Henrietta Maria, and the husband of Marguerite Courtin, Madame de Vantelet. Sir William died during the lifetime of his father, leaving an only son, by him and Christina: 
 Charles, successor to his grandfather
 John, who married Mary, daughter and heiress of George Bailley, Esquire, and d.s.p.

A depiction of Sir John Shelley, 1st Baronet can be seen on the memorial brass of his parents in St. Mary the Virgin Church, Clapham, West Sussex.

References 

Baronets in the Baronetage of the United Kingdom
Shelley baronets, of Michelgrove